Wilna Adriaanse (born 1958) is a South African Afrikaans romantic fiction writer. Her first book, Die wingerd sal weer bot, was published in 2000 under the name Wilmine Burger. Her book,  'n Heildronk op liefde, won the 2003 Lapa Publishers’ Prize for Romance and in 2009 she was awarded the ATKV-Woordveertjie prize for her novel, Die boek van Ester.

Adriaanse was born on 19 March 1958 in the Kalahari, and grew up in Worcester. She matriculated in 1976 from Worcester High School. She earned a BA and BA honours in development administration from the University of Stellenbosch. In 2011, she completed a master's degree with distinction in Creative Writing at the University of Cape Town. Her thesis was also published under the title, 'n Klein Lewe by Tafelberg. In 1981, she married Deon Adriaanse and settled in Giyani. In 1985 the couple moved to the Western Cape and lived in Durbanville till 2011, whereafter she followed her husband who worked in various locations in Africa and are residing on a farm on the banks of the Madikwe River in Ramonaka in the Republic of Botswana. They have three children.

Works 
As Wilna Adriaanse:
 ’n Ongewone belegging, Jasmyn, 2001
 Alleenvlug, Jasmyn, 2002
 Die reuk van verlange, Jasmyn, 2003
 Serenade vir ’n nagtegaal, Jasmyn, 2004
 Rebecca, Tafelberg, 2004
 Hande wat heel, Hartklop, 2005
 Met ander woorde, Tafelberg, 2006
 Die boek van Ester, Tafelberg, 2008
 Vier seisoene kind, Tafelberg, 2010
 'n Klein lewe, Tafelberg, 2012
 Dubbelspel, Tafelberg, 2014
 Eindspel, Tafelberg, 2017
 Blindside, Tafelberg, 2019 (Translation of Dubbelspel)
 Endgame, Tafelberg, 2020 (Translation of Eindspel)
 Vlug, Tafelberg, 2021
As Wilmine Burger:
 Die wingerd sal weer bot, Lapa, 2000
 ’n Heildronk op die liefde, Lapa, 2002
 Liefde is ’n kleur, Lapa, 2002
 Brug van woorde, Lapa, 2004

References 

1958 births
Living people
People from Dawid Kruiper Local Municipality
Afrikaner people
South African women novelists
Afrikaans-language writers
21st-century South African novelists
21st-century South African women writers